Hair tourniquet is a condition where hair or thread becomes tightly wrapped around most commonly a toe, and occasionally a finger, genitals, or other body parts. This results in pain and swelling of the affected part. Complications can include tissue death due to lack of blood flow. It occurs most commonly among children around 4 months of age, though cases have been described in older children and adults.

Most cases occur accidentally. Risk factors may include autism and trichotillomania. The mechanism is believed to involve wet hair become wrapped around a body part and then tightening as it dries. Diagnosis involves examination of the entire child. Prevention is by keeping the parent's hair from contact with the baby such as by the parent keeping their hair brushed and back and washing the baby's clothing separately.

Treatment is with a substance that breaks down hair or cutting through the hair. The condition is rare. Males and females are equally frequently affected. The first medical description dates from 1832. In some cultures thread is tied around the penis of children with bedwetting or for luck.

Signs and symptoms
As this is a condition primarily of young children, symptoms are rarely reported.  The child will become suddenly uncomfortable and miserable.  As the digit is often inside a sock, the cause may not be clear.

The affected toe can no longer receive an adequate blood supply via the arteries, nor can blood be drained via the veins.  The toe will therefore swell and turn blue, indicating ischemia.

The ligature will not stretch in response to the toe swelling and will therefore cut into the skin in more severe cases, like a cheese-wire.

Treatment

The ligature is cut or dissolved as quickly as possible.  Often it is possible to lift a portion of it to enable cutting, but in a severe case the ligature must be cut through the skin.  This is, of course, injurious to the child, but may prevent loss of the digit.  It must take place on the side of the toe, where there are no nerves or tendons.

Other treatment not requiring minor surgery includes use of a chemical depilatory, such as the over-the-counter product Nair, to dissolve or weaken the hair. This option is not indicated if the hair tourniquet has cut into the skin. Use of depilatory products such as Nair is not an effective treatment on nylon or other fibers that are not human hair.

Prognosis
Despite the distressing nature of the condition, outcomes are excellent.  Loss of the toe is extremely rare, as is any residual disability. In rare cases the loss of a digit is possible. Rubber bands can have the same effect.

See also
 Tourniquet

References

Injuries
Infancy
Safety